Charles Steve Zembillas is an American character designer, art director, educator, and author. Zembillas designed early concept art for games such as Crash Bandicoot, Spyro the Dragon, and Jak and Daxter: The Precursor Legacy, as well as animated television series such as Wish Kid, Where's Waldo?, James Bond Jr., and Ghostbusters.

He currently teaches art in his home state of California.

Career
Charles Zembillas was a character designer for the television series She-Ra: Princess of Power from 1985 to 1987 for a total of ninety-three episodes. He was also a character designer in 1985 for the film The Secret of the Sword, and would go on to be the art director of the television series Ghostbusters for sixty-five episodes in 1986. In 1987 Zembillas was commissioned for Spiral Zone as a character designer for sixty-five episodes.

In 1991, Charles Zembillas was commissioned to work as an animator, art director, and character designer for movies and TV shows such as Wish Kid, Where's Waldo?, Captain N, and James Bond Jr. In 1993, he was the character designer of the TV series Hurricanes as "Skevos Zembillas". In the same year, he also served as the storyboard reviser for the TV series Sonic the Hedgehog.

In 1996, Charles Zembillas worked for Naughty Dog Inc. on a new project known as "Crash Bandicoot", a video game series for the Sony PlayStation. Zembillas would continue to work for Naughty Dog in 1998 with Crash Bandicoot: Warped.

In the year 2000, Zembillas designed early concept art for Naughty Dog in the game Jak and Daxter: The Precursor Legacy, as well as Spyro: Year of the Dragon.

Charles Zembillas currently serves as the CEO, Founder, and Instructor at The Animation Academy in California.

Filmography and games

References

American animators
American art directors
American storyboard artists
People from Gary, Indiana
Prop designers
Living people
Video game artists
Video game developers
Naughty Dog people
Year of birth missing (living people)